The Polynesian Cultural Center (PCC) is a family-centered cultural tourist attraction and living museum located in Laie, on the northern shore of Oahu, Hawaii. The PCC is owned by the Church of Jesus Christ of Latter-day Saints (LDS Church), was dedicated on October 12, 1963, and occupies  of land belonging to nearby Brigham Young University–Hawaii (BYU-Hawaii).

The PCC encompasses eight simulated tropical villages, in which performers demonstrate various arts and crafts from throughout Polynesia. Visitors may also take a free shuttle tour of the university and see the LDS Church's Laie Hawaii Temple and its associated visitors' center.

Seventy percent of the PCC's approximately 1,300 employees are students at BYU-Hawaii. Since it has opened, the PCC has provided financial assistance to more than 12,000 BYU-Hawaii students. Students may work up to 20 hours per week during school terms and 40 hours during breaks. As a non-profit organization, PCC's revenue are used for daily operations and to support education.

History
In early 1962, LDS Church president David O. McKay authorized construction of the nonprofit center as a way to provide employment and scholarships for students at BYU-Hawaii and to preserve the cultures of Polynesia. It has its roots in 1940s and 1950s hukilau and luau beach gatherings to earn money to rebuild a local chapel belonging to the LDS Church, which had been destroyed in a fire. "The Hukilau Song," made famous by Alfred Apaka, was written following the composer and song's original singer, Jack Owens, visit to Lāi.e.'s hukilau. In October 1980, Guangdong Party first secretary Xi Zhongxun, father of current Chinese leader Xi Jinping, visited the PCC during a tour of the United States. After the September 11 attacks attendance suffered at the PCC. In 2004, the PCC doubled its advertising budget, "to promote local music, dance and food festivals".

The PCC is one of the most frequently visited tourist destinations in Hawaii, attracting 700,000 visitors annually. The PCC is the venue for the annual World Fire Knife Dance Competition, in which contestants display their skill with blazing swords. Since it opened its doors in 1963, over 32 million people have visited the center. Howard W. Hunter is credited with transforming the newly organized PCC from an unprofitable and unknown entity into one of the most popular tourist attractions in Hawaii.

Activities

Hā–Breath of Life
In addition to the daytime exhibits and demonstrations, PCC features an evening show for an additional charge. As of 2009 the show is a multicultural Polynesian show titled Hā–Breath of Life which The New York Times described as "a vivid, energetic production that highlights song and dance from the indigenous cultures of the South Pacific". The show features songs and dances from throughout Polynesia, including the hula, tamure, otea, titi torea, haka, poi, meke, tauʻolunga, and Taualuga. Past shows include "This is Polynesia", "Mana: The Spirit of Our People.", and Horizons: Where the Sea Meets the Sky. The show reportedly has a cast of 100 performers and they perform six-evenings-a-week.

Huki: A Canoe Celebration
The Lagoon hosts a parade of canoes that showcases the signature dances of each of Polynesian culture. The current show, "Huki: A Canoe Celebration", which premiered in August 2018, was preceded by "Rainbows of Paradise", "This is Polynesia" and "Ancient Legends of Polynesia".

Villages
Each of the major Polynesian cultures has its own section, centered on a traditional village. Hourly performances and cultural learning experiences take place in these villages. Villages include: 

Hawaii
Samoa
Aotearoa (New Zealand)
Fiji
Tahiti
Tonga
the Marquesas Islands

In addition to the villages, the PCC has a special exhibit dedicated to Rapa Nui (Easter Island or Isla de Pascua) and a tribute to the 1850s LDS mission. Visitors may participate in a luau, such as the Alii Luau ("Royal Feast"), which offers traditional Polynesian fare, including pork cooked in an imu (an  underground oven). They can observe the roasted pig in the imu prior to the meal. The PCC has its own Special effect theater as well as a lagoon where visitors can take canoe rides accompanied by a guide or paddle by themselves.

Special events
PCC hosts many special events, highlighting Hawaiian, Samoan, Tahitian and Māori cultures along with a Christmas festival. The PCC used to host a Haunted Lagoon but discontinued this festival in 2013 due to it not being profitable. Other festivals include Moanikeala Hula festival and World Fireknife Championships and Micronesia Betelnut festival.

Gallery

See also

 The Church of Jesus Christ of Latter-day Saints in Hawaii

References

External links

The Official Polynesian Cultural Center Website
PCC 50 Year Anniversary website (official)

Museums established in 1963
1963 establishments in Hawaii
Brigham Young University–Hawaii
Hawaii culture
Organizational subdivisions of the Church of Jesus Christ of Latter-day Saints
Properties of the Church of Jesus Christ of Latter-day Saints
The Church of Jesus Christ of Latter-day Saints in Hawaii
The Church of Jesus Christ of Latter-day Saints in Oceania
Living museums in Hawaii
Ethnic museums in Hawaii
Museums in Honolulu County, Hawaii
Mormonism and Pacific Islanders
Polynesian-American culture in Hawaii